Transcriber is an open-source software tool for the transcription and annotation of speech signals for linguistic research. It supports multiple hierarchical layers of segmentation, named entity annotation, speaker lists, topic lists, and overlapping speakers. Two views of the sound pressure waveform at different resolutions may be viewed simultaneously. Various character encodings, including Unicode, are supported.

Annotations from Transcriber may be exported in XML.  OASIS' Cover Pages publishes the open DTD used by Transcriber.

Transcriber is written in Tcl/Tk with the Snack audio library and is therefore available on most major platforms. It is distributed under the GNU General Public License. Transcriber has been superseded by TranscriberAG.

References

Bibliography

External links
Transcriber home page

Linguistic research software
Free software programmed in Tcl
Software that uses Tk (software)
Qualitative research
Science software for Linux